Bob Love (born 24 April 1954) is a British lawn bowler. He competed for England in the open para-sport triples event at the 2014 Commonwealth Games where he won a bronze medal. 
Bob currently plays at Tamworth IBC in inter club competitions and leagues

References

1954 births
Living people
Bowls players at the 2014 Commonwealth Games
Commonwealth Games bronze medallists for England
English male bowls players

Commonwealth Games medallists in lawn bowls
Medallists at the 2014 Commonwealth Games